Levi Lowrey is a singer-songwriter from Dacula, Georgia. He has performed extensively as a solo artist, headliner, and as the supporting act for well known names including Clay Cook, and Zac Brown Band. He is a great-grandson of Gid Tanner. Lowrey is one of the co-writers of the 'Colder Weather' performed by Zac Brown Band that went #1 for two weeks. Lowrey is also the co- writer of Zac Brown Band single 'The Wind" from their #1 Billboard album Uncaged. He is a CMA nominee for "Colder Weather" 2012 BMI Country Award Winner Top 50 songs of the year Colder Weather. 2011 and 2012 voted Best Local Songwriter- Creative Loafing. Roughstock named Levi 13 of 13: Ones to watch in 2013.

Lowrey has performed on many Zac Brown Band projects including the live album, "Pass the Jar: Zac Brown Band and Friends Live from the Fabulous Fox Theatre In Atlanta", the exclusive compilation, "Breaking Southern Ground", and Zac Brown Band's "You Get What You Give".

Discography

Full-Lengths

Double Albums 
Roots & Branches, 2016

Live albums 
"Live at the Red Clay Music Foundry," 2017

Guest appearances

Album appearances

Co-wrote songs

References

External links
Official Homepage

Living people
American country singer-songwriters
People from Dacula, Georgia
Year of birth missing (living people)
Country musicians from Georgia (U.S. state)
Singer-songwriters from Georgia (U.S. state)